Mohammad-Hossein Baniasadi is an Iranian politician and a senior member of the Freedom Movement of Iran. He served as the minister for executive affairs in the Interim Government of Iran.

References

Living people
Freedom Movement of Iran politicians
Wharton School of the University of Pennsylvania alumni
1942 births
Members of the Association for Defense of Freedom and the Sovereignty of the Iranian Nation
People from Arak, Iran
20th-century Iranian people
21st-century Iranian people
Iranian expatriates in the United States